Marj (also known as Marj Pāqal‘eh) is a village in Pa Qaleh Rural District, in the Central District of Shahr-e Babak County, Kerman Province, Iran. At the 2006 census, its population was 187, in 53 families.

References

Populated places in Shahr-e Babak County